, also called Ifuri, was a short-lived province located in Hokkaidō.  It corresponds to modern-day Iburi Subprefecture, Yamakoshi District of Oshima, Abuta District in Shiribeshi Subprefecture, the cities of Chitose and Eniwa in Ishikari Subprefecture and Shimukappu Village in Kamikawa Subprefecture.

History
After 1869, the northern Japanese island was known as Hokkaido; and regional administrative subdivisions were identified, including Iburi Province.

At the same time, Iburi Province continued to exist for some purposes. For example, Iburi is explicitly recognized in treaties in 1894 (a) between Japan and the United States and (b) between Japan and the United Kingdom.

Timeline
1869—use of the name Hokkaido started
August 15, 1869 Iburi Province established with 8 districts
1872 Census shows a population of 6,251
 1882—prefectures established
 1886—Hokkaido Agency established
 1947—Hokkaido Prefecture established

Districts
Yamakoshi (山越郡)
Abuta District (虻田郡)
Usu (有珠郡)
Muroran (室蘭郡) Dissolved February 1, 1918 when four towns and villages merged to form Muroran-ku
Yoribetsu (幌別郡) Dissolved August 1, 1970 when Noboribetsu Town became Noboribetsu City
Shiraoi (白老郡)
Yūfutsu (勇払郡)
Chitose (千歳郡) Dissolved November 11, 1970 when Eniwa Town became a city

Notes

References
 Nussbaum, Louis-Frédéric and Käthe Roth. (2005).  Japan encyclopedia. Cambridge: Harvard University Press. ;  OCLC 58053128
 Papinot, Edmond. (1910). Historical and Geographic Dictionary of Japan. Tokyo: Librarie Sansaisha. OCLC 77691250

Other websites 

  Murdoch's map of provinces, 1903

1869 establishments in Japan
1882 disestablishments in Japan
Former provinces of Japan